Claudin-16 is a protein that in humans is encoded by the CLDN16 gene. It belongs to the group of claudins.

Tight junctions represent one mode of cell-to-cell adhesion in epithelial or endothelial cell sheets, forming continuous seals around cells and serving as a physical barrier to prevent solutes and water from passing freely through the paracellular space. These junctions are composed of sets of continuous networking strands in the outwardly facing cytoplasmic leaflet, with complementary grooves in the inwardly facing extracytoplasmic leaflet. The protein encoded by this gene, a member of the claudin family, is an integral membrane protein and a component of tight junction strands. It is found primarily in the kidneys, specifically in the thick ascending limb of Henle, where it acts as either an intercellular pore or ion concentration sensor to regulate the paracellular resorption of magnesium ions. Defects in this gene are a cause of primary hypomagnesemia, which is characterized by massive renal magnesium wasting with hypomagnesemia and hypercalciuria, resulting in nephrocalcinosis and kidney failure.

Model organisms

Model organisms have been used in the study of CLDN16 function. A conditional knockout mouse line, called Cldn16tm1a(KOMP)Wtsi was generated as part of the International Knockout Mouse Consortium program — a high-throughput mutagenesis project to generate and distribute animal models of disease to interested scientists.

Male and female animals underwent a standardized phenotypic screen to determine the effects of deletion. Twenty five tests were carried out on homozygous mutant animals and one significant abnormality was observed: the mice displayed urolithiasis.

References

External links

Further reading

 

Genes mutated in mice